Janusiscus schultzei is an extinct gnathostome vertebrate dating from the Early Devonian period in Siberia, approximately 415 million years ago. It may be the sister group of the last common ancestor of Chondrichthyes (cartilaginous fish) or Osteichthyes (bony fish). This makes J. schultzei a sister species to all living jawed vertebrates. The species name is in honor of Hans-Peter Schultze; the genus named after Janus, the Roman god of duality.

Taxonomy 

The following cladogram is simplified from Giles et al., 2015:

References

External links 
 Ancient fossil may rewrite fish family tree Viviane Callier. Jan. 12, 2015, 1:45 PM

Prehistoric fish genera
Fossil taxa described in 2015
Fossils of Russia
Early Devonian animals
Enigmatic vertebrate taxa